Stephenson Island may refer to:
Stephenson Island (California)
Stephenson Island (Georgia)
Stephenson Island (Wisconsin)
Stephenson Island (British Columbia, Canada)
Stephenson Island (Greenland)
Stephenson Island (Philippines)
Stephenson Island (North Island, New Zealand)

See also
Stevenson Island (Wyoming)
Stevenson Island (Antarctica)
Stevensons Island (South Island, New Zealand)